Assad Ali is a retired Syrian professor of Arabic literature (formerly at the University of Damascus) and prolific writer of contemporary Arabic poetry. He is also the founder and chairman of the World Union of Arabic Writers. His writings deal extensively with spiritual topics, with particular emphasis on Islamic mysticism and the Sufi tradition. One collection of his poems, Happiness without Death (1991), was published by Threshold Books in an English translation by Camille Helminski, Ibrahim Yahya Shihabi, and Kabir Helminski.

References

External links
 Mirror 12 (Personal Website)

Syrian poets